Margarya is a genus of large operculate freshwater snails, aquatic gastropod mollusks in the family Viviparidae.

Taxonomy
The genus Margarya was described by Nevill (1877) based on shells of the type species collected by A.R. Margary from Lake Erhai, the type locality of Margarya melanioides. Based on shell and radular morphology, Tchang & Tsi (1949) revised this genus for the first time and recognized seven distinct species. He  created two subgenera of Margarya , viz Tchangmargarya and Mabillemargarya. The first molecular phylogeny showed that the genus Margarya is polyphyletic and divided into three distinct clades.  Combining study of comparative morphology and molecular phylogeny, Zhang et al. revised the systematics of Margarya and recognized eight genuine extant species. However, only four species were found belonging to Margarya s. str., the rest species belonging to distinct genus Tchangmargarya or Anularya.

Distribution
This genus appear to be endemic to Dian Lake, Erhai Lake, Cibi Lake, Jianhu Lake, Xihu Lake, and Lugu Lake in Yunnan Province in the China.

Species
There are 4 extant species and 4 fossil species of Margarya s. str. Margarya bicostata and Margarya mansuyi are transferred to Anularya. Margarya yangtsunghaiensis is transferred to Tchangmargarya.
Species within the genus Margarya include 8 species:
(extant) Margarya francheti (Mabille, 1886)
(extant) Margarya melanioides Nevill, 1877 - type species
(extant) Margarya monodi (Dautzenberg & Fischer, 1905)
(extant) Margarya oxytropoides (Heude, 1889)
(fossil) Margarya spinicostata Li, 1987
(fossil) Margarya angulata Li, 1987
(fossil) Margarya nana Huang, 1986
(fossil) Margarya nanningensis Tian, Fuersich & Schneider 2013
Species brought into synonymy:
Margarya carinata (Neumayr, 1887): synonym of Margarya melanioides Nevill, 1877
Vivipara delavayi (Mabille, 1886): synonym of Margarya melanioides Nevill, 1877
Margarya tropidophora (Mabille, 1886): synonym of  Margarya francheti (Mabille, 1886)
Cipangopaludina dianchiensis Zhang, 1990: synonym of  Margarya oxytropoides (Heude, 1889)
Margarya melanioides dianchiensis Huang, 2007: synonym of  Margarya oxytropoides (Heude, 1889)
Margarya elongata Tchang & Tsi, 1949: synonym of Margarya monodi (Dautzenberg & H. Fischer, 1905)
Margarya tchangsii Xia, 1982: synonym of Margarya monodi (Dautzenberg & H. Fischer, 1905)
Margarya yangtsunghaiensis Tchang & Tsi, 1949: synonym of Tchangmargarya yangtsunghaiensis (Tchang & Tsi, 1949)
Margarya yini (Tchang & Tsi, 1982): synonym of Margarya monodi (Dautzenberg & H. Fischer, 1905)

Cladogram
The cladogram based on sequences of mitochondrial 16S ribosomal RNA and cytochrome-c oxidase I (COI), and nuclear ITS2 genes showing the phylogenic relationships of the genus Margarya indicates that Margarya is polyphyletic. Margarya as traditionally delimited decayed into three distinct clades. The sister lineages of two of these clades are representatives from different viviparid genera, which are widely distributed in East and Southeast Asian rivers and lakes. These predominantly riparian viviparids also differ markedly in their shell morphology. Herein only genus-level phylogenic relationship is given, whereas relationship between lower taxonomic units deserve further study.

References

External links

Photo of Margarya melanoides with background of the lake
 Kobelt W. (1909). "Die Gattung Paludina Lam. (Vivipara Montfort) (Neue Folge). In Abbildungen nach der Natur mit Beschreibungen". Systematisches Conchylien-Cabinet von Martini und Chemnitz, Nürnberg, 1(21a): pp. 97-430, plates 15-77., page 187-193, table 37-39.

Yen T. C. (1943). "A preliminary revision of the Recent species of Chinese Viviparidae". The Nautilus 56: 124-130.

Viviparidae